Hazza Salem Mohd Saeed Al Faresi (born 1 January  1989) is an Emirati footballer who plays for Al Wasl as a right back.

He played twice for Al Wasl FC at 2010 AFC Champions League.

External links
  Hazaa Statistics At Goalzz.com
http://www.alainfc.net/en/index.php?p=playerinfo&pid=352

1989 births
Living people
Emirati footballers
Al Ain FC players
Al-Wasl F.C. players
Al Dhafra FC players
Al-Nasr SC (Dubai) players
Khor Fakkan Sports Club players
Dibba FC players
UAE Pro League players
UAE First Division League players
Association football fullbacks